Budapesti Atlétikai Klub, also known as BAK, is a Hungarian football club from the town of Budapest that competes in the BLSZ III.

History
Budapesti Atlétikai Klub was founded in 1900 by a group of athletes who had decided to leave their previous sports club MTK Budapest because, at that time, there was no football section at MTK. It debuted in the 1906–07 season of the Hungarian League and finished fourth. The club remained in the top flight for 15 years, before being relegated in 1921. BAK eventually folded in 1947.

Reforming of the club

The club was reformed for the first time in more than 70 years ahead of the 2018/19 season by a group of local enthusiasts inspired by the story of one of BAK's most famous former players, Ernő Egri Erbstein, who played for the original club from 1916 to 1924. Led by club president Bertalan Molnar, BAK merged with an existing team called Respect and took that club's place in BLSZ III, the sixth tier of Hungarian football. The club is commonly referred to by the acronym BAK, and as the word 'bak' means 'ram' in Hungarian, a ram's head appears on the club's new logo.

Friendships

In November 2018, the newly re-established BAK announced the rekindling of a friendship with the English amateur club Corinthian-Casuals FC, based on shared values and a history that goes back to the days when the original Corinthian Football Club visited Budapest to play a series of games in 1904. They established a trophy called the Corinthian Cup, in which the original incarnation of BAK competed several times, and a visit of Corinthian-Casuals supporters and officials in November 2018 sparked the renewal of the friendship between the two clubs.

BAK's friendship with Corinthian-Casuals led to the inauguration of a new international competition, called the Egri Erbstein Tournament, and designed to be an invitational event for like-minded, grass-roots football clubs from all over the world. The club announced that the first edition of the tournament would be held at the Szőnyi úti Stadion, in the Zugló district of Budapest, where BAK were originally based, in June 2019. The four competing clubs were announced as BAK, Corinthian-Casuals, Budapesti EAC and Testvériség SE and it was confirmed that the winner would be awarded the Corinthian Cup, a new trophy named after that which was originally presented to the amateur football clubs of Budapest by Corinthian FC in 1905.

Name changes 
1900–1910: Budapesti Athletikai Klub
1910: merger with Csepeli Athletikai Club
1910–1911: Budapest-Csepeli Athletikai Klub
1911–1926: Budapesti Atlétikai Klub
1920: merger with Nemzeti Torna Club
1926–1928: Budapesti Atlétikai Klub FC 
1928 -: Budapesti Atlétikai Klub Testgyakorlók Köre
2018: re-established as Budapesti Atlétikai Klub

Honours
Hungarian Cup:
 Runner-up (1) :1912–13

References

External links
 Profil

Football clubs in Budapest
1900 establishments in Hungary
Association football clubs established in 1900